Collin Benjamin (born 3 August 1978) is a Namibian former professional footballer who played as a midfielder. He spent most of his professional career with Hamburger SV while representing Namibia at international level.

Benjamin represented Namibia at the 2008 African Cup of Nations, earning 32 caps; he captained the team for several years. Benjamin was known for his speed and was mainly used for wing play as a defender.

He was named as the head coach of the Namibia national team in June 2022, succeeding Bobby Samaria.

After his 10 years at Hamburg Benjamin ended his playing career in Germany at 1860 Munich, where he then spent time in the club's coaching set-up.

Benjamin, who won 41 caps for Namibia and captained his country, said he was up to the "daunting" challenge of coaching the Brave Warriors - but would require "resources to accomplish the task ahead" of him.

Namibia began their 2023 Africa Cup of Nations qualifying campaign with a 1–1 draw against Burundi in neutral Johannesburg earlier in June 2022.

Honours
 DFB-Ligapokal winner: 2003

Aside from representing Hamburg and 1860 Munich during his active days, Benjamin remains the only Namibian to play in the Uefa Champions League.

Managerial statistics
As of 17 July 2022.

Note: win or lose by penalty shoot-out is counted as the draw in time.

References

External links
 

1978 births
Living people
Footballers from Windhoek
Namibian football managers
Association football midfielders
Namibia international footballers
2008 Africa Cup of Nations players
F.C. Civics Windhoek players
Hamburger SV players
Hamburger SV II players
TSV 1860 Munich players
Bundesliga players
2. Bundesliga players
Namibia national football team managers
Namibian expatriate footballers
Namibian expatriate sportspeople in Germany
Expatriate footballers in Germany
Namibian men's footballers